Žerotín refers to the following places in the Czech Republic:

 Žerotín (Louny District)
 Žerotín (Olomouc District)